The Gap Mountains are a mountain range in eastern Nye County, Nevada. Gap Mountain along with Fox Mountain  to the south and the hills between overlook the White River valley to the west.

Nevada State Route 318 lies to the east of Gap and Fox mountains where the White River makes an arcuate bend around the west side of the mountains.

References 

Mountain ranges of Nevada
Mountain ranges of Nye County, Nevada
Mountain ranges of the Great Basin